Kyle Bickley (born 27 February 2002) is a speedway rider from England.

Speedway career 
Bickley has ridden in the top two tiers of British Speedway. During his debut season he rode for Workington Comets, where he won the league and cup double. He captained the Belle Vue Colts during the 2019 National Development League speedway season.

In 2021, he signed for the Berwick Bandits in the SGB Championship. In the SGB Championship 2022, he initially rode for Berwick before joining Newcastle Diamonds but following their collapse he moved to Redcar Bears. He also rode for Berwick Bullets during the 2022 National Development League speedway season.

In 2023, he signed for Edinburgh Monarchs for the SGB Championship 2023 and would also captain their junior side in the NDL.

References 

Living people
2002 births
British speedway riders
Belle Vue Colts riders
Berwick Bandits riders
Edinburgh Monarchs riders
Glasgow Tigers riders
Redcar Bears riders
Sheffield Tigers riders
Workington Comets riders
Sportspeople from Whitehaven